St Colm's College was established in Edinburgh in 1894 as a missionary training college for women, with Annie Hunter Small as its first principal.

In August 2010, the College's property would eventually be sold off after the Church of Scotland determined it could no longer afford to maintain it.

Various names 
The College was first established in October 1894 as the Women's Missionary Training Institute as part of the Free Church of Scotland. After the Free Church merged with the United Presbyterian Church to form the new United Free Church of Scotland, the College would be renamed as the Women's Missionary College in 1908. Subsequent to this, the United Free Church of Scotland would merge with the Church of Scotland in 1929, and the College would once again be renamed as the Church of Scotland Women's Missionary College. In 1960, the Church of Scotland would rename it St Colm's College. By 1998, it would be renamed St Colm's International House and used as accommodations for students from the majority world.

Training 
Much of the vision of training at St Colm's was driven by the work of its first principal, Annie Hunter Small, a Scot and a former Zenana missionary worker in India. Teaching for the College brought together a mixture of theoretical and practical skills, and many of the female students enrolled in classes at New College.

Women trained at the College would come from a variety of denominational backgrounds and eventually work in the Scottish Highlands and amongst Jewish communities, but also overseas in Africa, China, and India.

List of teachers at St Colm's
 Mary Lusk (1958–1963)
 Kenneth Mackenzie (1957–1968)
 Annie H. Small (1894–1913)
 Olive Wyon (1950s)

List of students at St Colm's
 Evangeline Edwards (c. 1913)
 Mary Lusk (1940s)
 Anne Hepburn (late 1940s)
 Elizabeth Mantell (1966)
 Stella Jane Reekie (1949–1951)
 Marjorie Saunders (1965–1968)

See also 

 Church of Scotland
 Zenana missions

References 

Protestantism in Scotland
Church of Scotland
Educational institutions established in 1894
Bible colleges, seminaries and theological colleges in Scotland
1894 establishments in Scotland